Crossing Jordan is an American crime drama television series created by Tim Kring, that aired on NBC from September 24, 2001, to May 16, 2007. It stars Jill Hennessy as Dr. Jordan Cavanaugh, a crime-solving forensic pathologist employed in the Massachusetts Office of the Chief Medical Examiner. In addition to Jordan, the show followed an ensemble cast composed of Jordan's co-workers and police detectives assigned to the various cases.

After six seasons and 117 episodes, the series was canceled by NBC on May 14, 2007, and concluded on May 16, 2007.

Cast and characters

Main
 Jill Hennessy portrays Dr. Jordan Cavanaugh: A forensic pathologist in the Boston Medical Examiner's Office obsessed with solving violent crimes after her mother's murder.
 Miguel Ferrer portrays Dr. Garret Macy: The Chief Medical Examiner and Jordan's boss who deals with her erratic behavior as well as his own confused family.
 Ken Howard portrays Maximilian "Max" Cavanaugh: An ex-cop-turned-bar-owner and Jordan's father.
 Mahershala Ali portrays Dr. Trey Sanders: A medical examiner working on a grant.
 Ravi Kapoor portrays Dr. "Bug" Vijay (born Mahesh Vijayaraghavensatanaryanamurthy): A shy but intense forensic entomologist.
 Kathryn Hahn portrays Lily Lebowski: A perky intake secretary and later grief counselor.
 Steve Valentine portrays Dr. Nigel Townsend: A wise-cracking British forensic technician and self-styled criminologist. 
 Lorraine Toussaint portrays Dr. Elaine Duchamps: An initially antagonistic medical examiner.
 Ivan Sergei portrays Dr. Peter Winslow: A medical examiner and recovering drug addict.
 Jerry O'Connell portrays Woodrow "Woody" Hoyt: A quirky Boston Police Department homicide detective, transplanted from Wisconsin, who works regularly with Jordan.
 Leslie Bibb portrays Tallulah "Lu" Simmons: A Boston Police Department psychologist and homicide detective romantically involved with Woody.

Medical Examiners
 Jennifer Finnigan portrays Dr. Devan Maguire: A pathology resident who occasionally butts heads with Jordan.
 Eugene Byrd portrays Dr. Sidney Trumaine: An eager-to-prove-himself medical examiner.
 Brooke Smith portrays Dr. Kate Switzer: A cantankerous medical examiner assigned to the Medical Examiner's Office by Lu.

Boston Police Department
 D. W. Moffett portrays Eddie Winslow: A dismissive homicide detective and Max Cavanaugh's final partner.
 Amy Aquino portrays Lois Carver: A no-nonsense homicide detective.
 David Monahan portrays Matt Seely: A misogynistic and insensitive detective.
 Arija Bareikis portrays Annie Capra: A homicide detective briefly partnered with Woody.
 Sandra Bernhard portrays Roz Framus: A homicide detective with a tendency to tease Dr. Vijay.
 Camille Guaty portrays Luisa Santana: A homicide detective partnered with Woody on two cases.
 Boris Kodjoe portrays Elliot Chandler: A homicide detective who worked with the Medical Examiner's Office on two occasions.

District Attorneys
 Susan Gibney portrays Renee Walcott: A no-nonsense attorney romantically involved with Garrett.
 Brian Stokes Mitchell portrays Jay Myers: An attorney who has a sexual encounter with Jordan.
 Ethan Sandler portrays Jeffrey Brandau: An assistant district attorney who becomes romantically involved with Lily and becomes the father of her daughter.
 Jeffrey Donovan portrays William Ivers: An attorney who drastically lowers the budget of the Medical Examiner's Office.

Civilians
 Wallace Shawn portrays Dr. Howard Stiles: The Medical Examiner's Office's resident psychiatrist.
 Emy Coligado portrays Emmy: An assistant in the Medical Examiner's Office.
 Alex McKenna portrays Abby Macy: Dr. Macy's estranged daughter.
 Lindsay Frost portrays Maggie Macy: Dr. Macy's ex-wife.
 Jack Laufer portrays Herman Redding: A psychiatric patient and murder suspect who claims to have knowledge about the death of Jordan's mother.
 Michael T. Weiss portrays James Horton: Jordan's illegitimate half-brother.
 Lesley Ann Warren portrays Arlene Lebowski: Lily's estranged aunt and adoptive mother.
 Brian Kimmet portrays Oliver Titleman: A young student obsessed with creating the perfect crime.
 Charles Mesure portrays J.D. Pollack: An Australian reporter romantically involved with Jordan.

Production
 
Crossing Jordan was created by Tim Kring and was produced by Tailwind Productions in association with NBCUniversal. Singer-songwriter duo Wendy and Lisa scored the music for the show. Eric Rigler's pipes and whistles can be heard in most episodes. The scientific aspects of the show are comparable to CSI: Crime Scene Investigation, but Crossing Jordan is more character-driven and less graphic than the CSI franchise.

In the first season, Hennessy was the only cast member visible during the opening credits, which featured Eric Rigler's arrangement of a traditional Irish tune "The Boys on the Hilltop" (a quicker tempo, but shorter version of "Reels Part One -- The Boys on the Hilltop" from the Bad Haggis CD Trip). Starting with the second season, the credits showed all the major players and used a more rock-like, less-Irish-sounding opening theme.

Crossing Jordan is set in the same fictional universe as fellow NBC series Las Vegas. In the season-four episode "What Happens in Vegas Dies in Boston", a case takes Jordan and Woody to Las Vegas, where Woody became very well-acquainted with the Montecito's casino host, Sam Marquez (Vanessa Marcil). They maintained a long-distance relationship for a while: O'Connell appeared in five episodes of Las Vegas and Vanessa Marcil appeared as Sam in two Crossing Jordan episodes.

Reception
USA Today gave the show a two-star review and said, "What truly strains belief—and your viewing patience—are the absurd quirks Jordan adds to its plot and its characters to try to set itself apart." The New York Times called it "engaging and entertaining" and "Hennessy gives Jordan an appealing, loose-cannon attitude."

Broadcast
Crossing Jordan premiered in 2001 on NBC. It aired on Mondays, Fridays, Sundays and finally Wednesdays for its final episodes. 

The show was put on hiatus for most of the 2003–2004 season to accommodate Hennessy's real-life pregnancy. The series returned on March 9, 2004, with a shortened 13-episode season. Due to the season being broadcast out of order, the cliffhanger plotline from the season-two finale was aired as the last episode of the season instead of the first; instead, the first featured an unrelated story with a humorous subplot that paid homage to Alfred Hitchcock's 1954 film Rear Window. 

A crossover episode of Las Vegas in which the Crossing Jordan cast appears was aired on November 17, 2006, though NBC was not airing new episodes of Crossing Jordan in autumn 2006. 

Originally, the sixth season was slated for Sunday nights after the football season ended in January, but it was then scheduled to premiere on October 20, 2006, and to be on Friday nights with Medium being put into the after-football Sunday-night slot. It was scheduled to air at 8 pm Eastern/Pacific and 7 pm Central/Mountain, but NBC decided to avoid showing scripted programming at that hour. The season premiere was pre-empted in favor of 1 vs. 100, a game show hosted by Bob Saget. The season premiere ran on January 14, 2007, at 10 pm Eastern/Pacific and 9 pm Central. Beginning March 7, 2007, the show moved to a new time slot, Wednesday 9/8C where it was promoted as a female empowerment block with Medium.

Syndication
NBC tried syndicating Crossing Jordan during its second season. Reruns are often shown on A&E in the United States and Canada. Currently, it airs in syndication on CIN (Crime and Investigation Network) and Start TV. In January 2021, the Roku Channel in the U.S. released all episodes of Crossing Jordan to stream.

Cancellation
Originally, the finale for the sixth season was promoted as a cliffhanger. A plane crash which left all of the main characters (with the exception of Lily) stranded atop a mountain with little hope of being discovered was reported to end with no resolution, as the story would pick up at the onset of a subsequent season. Once NBC decided against renewing Crossing Jordan for a seventh year, though, fans were treated to a different ending: Jordan ultimately confronts her held-in feelings for Woody and finally professes her love, and all of the characters are rescued in the final moments of the series. The ending provided fuel to rumors that producers recorded two endings to the finale: one in case the series would be renewed, and another in case the series would not be. 

The series was cancelled on May 14, 2007, two days before the season six finale aired.

Home media

Episodes and ratings

DVD releases 
NBC announced in January 2007 that it was making progress securing music rights to allow the show to be released on DVD. (Crossing Jordan relies heavily on pop music in its soundtrack.) The first season was released on DVD on May 6, 2008, and there is no notice of substitution of music on the DVD packaging. However, as of January 2018, the latter seasons were still not available via DVD in the US. In Germany, the second season was released on DVD and Blu-ray via Koch Media on September 10, 2015. Koch Media already re-released a remastered version of the first season in May 2015.

The complete 27-disc DVD collection is available in Australia from JB HI-FI, EzyDVD, Dymocks., Sanity and Via Vision Entertainment.

References

External links

 

2001 American television series debuts
2007 American television series endings
2000s American drama television series
English-language television shows
2000s American legal television series
NBC original programming
2000s American medical television series
Television series by Universal Television
Television shows set in Boston
Television series created by Tim Kring
Fictional portrayals of the Boston Police Department
Impact of the September 11 attacks on television